This is a list of chairmen of the Central Executive Committee, chairmen of the Presidium of the Supreme Soviet, and chairmen of the Executive Committee of the Crimean ASSR (1921–1945) and the Crimean Oblast (1945–1991) in the Russian SFSR (from February 19, 1954 in the Ukrainian SSR) of the Soviet Union. The position was created on November 7, 1921, and abolished on March 22, 1991.

Soon after the evacuation of the White Volunteer Army, during 1920–1921 Crimea was governed at first by the Soviet Commander of the 4th Army (Vladimir Lazarevich and then the Crimea revkom (Bela Kun and Mikhail Polyakov).

In 1991 the post was replaced with Prime Minister of Crimea.

List of chairmen

See also
Crimean ASSR
Crimean Oblast
Crimea Regional Committee of the Communist Party of Ukraine
Prime Minister of Crimea and Presidential representative of Ukraine in Crimea

Notes

Sources
 World Statesmen.org

Crimea
Crimea
Russian Soviet Federative Socialist Republic
Ukrainian Soviet Socialist Republic
Crimea in the Soviet Union
Politics of Crimea